Persepolis Khorasan Shomali Football Club is an Iranian football club based in Bojnord, Iran. They currently compete in the 2011–12 Khorasan Shomali Provincial League.

Season-by-Season

The table below shows the achievements of the club in various competitions.

See also
 Hazfi Cup

Football clubs in Iran
Association football clubs established in 2008
2008 establishments in Iran